Sympistis incubus is a moth of the family Noctuidae first described by James T. Troubridge in 2008. It is found in the US states of Washington and Oregon at elevations of 

Adults are on wing in September.

References

incubus
Moths described in 2008